Venugopal Rao or Venugopala Rao is one of the Indian names:

 Kamichetty Venougopala Rao Naidou, former mayor and MLA of Yanam Municipality
 Pappu Venugopala Rao, Indian educationist and musicologist
 Yalaka Venugopal Rao, Indian cricketer